Leptotrophon acerapex is a species of sea snail, a marine gastropod mollusk in the family Muricidae, the murex snails or rock snails.

Description
The length of the shell attains 9.2 mm.

Distribution
This marine species occurs off New Caledonia.

References

External links
 MNHN, Paris: holotype

Muricidae
Gastropods described in 1986